The Silvermine Mountains or Silvermines Mountains are a mountain range in County Tipperary, Ireland. Traditionally, the mountains were deemed to be part of the Slieve Felim Mountains.

The village of Silvermines is located to the north of the mountains and has been a mining centre since the 14th century.

There are three Special Areas of Conservation on the Silvermine Mountains; the Silvermine Mountains SAC is known for its Northern Atlantic wet heaths, with Erica tetralix and species-rich Nardus grassland; the Silvermines Mountains West SAC is known for its Northern Atlantic wet heaths, with Erica tetralix, and its European dry heaths and Calaminarian grasslands where the levels of heavy metals, such as lead, are high, and are toxic to many plant species; and Keeper Hill SAC, known for its Northern Atlantic wet heaths with Erica tetralix and blanket bogs.

History
The oldest records of mine workings here date to 1289 when miners from Italy were working the seams. Silver was extracted for use in coinage, and lead for materials for the roof of new monasteries being built in the 13th century. Mining continued sporadically over the next 600 years. By the mid-nineteenth century, there were three engine houses with beam engines for crushing, winding and pumping. A new phase of activity occurred in the 1960s when a new rich deposit was found which was worked on the surface and underground. Operations ceased in 1984 but left behind them waste tips and tailings ponds.

Slieve Felim Way
It is designated as a National Waymarked Trail by the National Trails Office of the Irish Sports Council and is managed by Shannon Development and Coillte.

References

Mountains and hills of County Limerick
Mountains and hills of County Tipperary
Special Areas of Conservation in the Republic of Ireland